Französische Straße was a Berlin U-Bahn underground station on the  line located under the street Friedrichstraße in central Berlin.

This station was built by Grenander/Fehse/Jennen and opened in 1923. In 1945 it closed for a few months; it was permanently closed in 1961. During the Cold War (1961–1990), the station became a ghost station. The station was closed to passenger traffic, and the underground trains of the West Berlin BVG passed the island platform in East Berlin slowly without stopping. In 1990, after the Berlin Wall fell, the station became accessible again. In 1995, the platform had to be lengthened by  so that the longer, six-car trains could stop there. It is the only former partition-related ghost station in Berlin to have since been closed a second time, albeit for different reasons.

2020 closure
With the opening of the expanded  line connecting Alexanderplatz with Berlin Hauptbahnhof, Französische Straße station was closed and replaced by the newly built Unter den Linden station directly to the north, allowing transfers between the U6 and U5 lines. The last trains called at Französische Straße on 3 December 2020, with Unter den Linden station opening the following day.

References

Buildings and structures in Mitte
Railway stations in Germany opened in 1923
Railway stations closed in 2020